Green Bottom Wildlife Management Area is located on former plantation lands of U.S. Congressman and Confederate General Albert G. Jenkins. The Green Bottom WMA land is a mixture of farmland, mixed hardwood forest, wetlands, and open water. The Jenkins Plantation Museum is located on Corps of Engineers land adjacent to the WMA. The museum is located in the original 1835 Green Bottom Plantation House, and is operated by the West Virginia Division of Culture and History.

Hunting and fishing

Fishing opportunities abound at Green Bottom from in the wetlands, along the banks of the Ohio River, and from boats using the local boat ramp.  Popular game fish in the Ohio River include  smallmouth bass, sauger, channel catfish, hybrid striped bass, carp, crappie, and freshwater drum. The state record bowfin fish was caught at Green Bottom.

Available hunting can include deer, rabbit, mourning dove,  squirrel, and waterfowl.  Deer hunting is permitted only with muzzle loading rifles or archery bows.  Camping is not permitted in the WMA.

Wildlife watching
Green Bottom WMA is also a popular location for watching wildlife.  Over 100 species of birds are regularly seen each year along the river bottom. More than 30 mammals, as well as several amphibians and reptiles, are available for viewing.  Structures such as nesting boxes and man-made islands have been built to improve the habitats for species ranging from the Jefferson salamander to the gray fox.  The Green Bottom Nature Trail and boardwalk provides easier access to the wetlands and forest lands of the WMA.

See also
Animal conservation
Birdwatching
Fishing
Hiking
Hunting
Kayaking
List of West Virginia wildlife management areas

References

External links
 West Virginia DNR District 5 Wildlife Management Areas
West Virginia Hunting Regulations
West Virginia Fishing Regulations

Wildlife management areas of West Virginia
Protected areas of Cabell County, West Virginia
Protected areas of Mason County, West Virginia
IUCN Category V